Belorgey is a French surname. Notable people with the surname include:

  (born 1944), French politician
 Vincent Belorgey alias Kavinsky (born 1975), French musician, producer, DJ, and actor

French-language surnames